Amrita Mukherjee is an Indian television actress. She is known for her role of Peehu Ram Kapoor (sometimes spelled Pihu) in the Sony TV soap opera Bade Acche Lagte Hain.

Television 
2012-2013 Bade Achhe Lagte Hain as Pihu / Peehu Ram Kapoor 
 2013 Kaun Banega Crorepati with Ram Kapoor & Sakshi Tanwar - as their daughter - Pihu / Peehu Ram Kapoor 
 2013 Comedy Circus Ke Mahabali as herself - Guest performer 
 2014 Comedy Nights with Kapil as herself - Special Appearance
 2015 Stories by Rabindranath Tagore as mini in Kabuliwala

Awards
 The 12th Indian Television Academy Awards, 2012, Most Promising Child Star as Pihu / Peehu Ram Kapoor
 The 12th Indian Telly Awards, 2013, Most Popular Child Artiste - Female as Pihu / Peehu Ram Kapoor
 Lions Gold Awards, 2013, Most Popular Child Actor on Television as Pihu / Peehu Ram Kapoor
 6th Boroplus Gold Awards, 2013, Most Popular Child Artist as Pihu / Peehu Ram Kapoor

References

External links
 Amrita Mukherjee, a package of cuteness
 Little Wonders of Small Screen
 

Living people
Indian television child actresses
Indian television actresses
Place of birth missing (living people)
Year of birth missing (living people)